Sosin is a Russian masculine surname, its feminine counterpart is Sosina. It may refer to
Howard Sosin, American businessman 
Łukasz Sosin (born 1977), Polish footballer striker
Olga Sosina (born 1992), Russian ice hockey forward

Russian-language surnames